The Church of San Martín (Spanish: Iglesia de San Martín) is a church located in Madrid, Spain. It was declared Bien de Interés Cultural in 1995.

See also 
Catholic Church in Spain
List of oldest church buildings

References 

Roman Catholic churches in Madrid
Bien de Interés Cultural landmarks in Madrid
Buildings and structures in Universidad neighborhood, Madrid